Dijana Kojić (born 26 July 1982) is a retired Bosnian sprinter. She competed in the women's 400 metres at the 2000 Summer Olympics.

References

External links
 

1982 births
Living people
Athletes (track and field) at the 2000 Summer Olympics
Bosnia and Herzegovina female sprinters
Olympic athletes of Bosnia and Herzegovina
Place of birth missing (living people)
World Athletics Championships athletes for Bosnia and Herzegovina
Olympic female sprinters